Maokopia is an extinct genus of Zygomaturinae from the Late Pleistocene of Irian Jaya, New Guinea. It is known from a partial skull and was a comparatively small species of diprotodontid, weighing 100 kg. Murray (1992) suggested that it was most closely related to Hulitherium. The teeth indicate a diet of hard ferns and grasses that still grow in the alpine meadows of the area (Long et al., 2002).

References

 Long, J., Archer, M., Flannery, T., & Hand, S. (2002) Prehistoric mammals of Australia and New Guinea: One hundred million years of evolution. University of New South Wales Press (pg. 
 Murray, Peter F. (1992) The smallest New Guinea zygomaturines derived dwarfs or relict plesiomorphs? [online]. Beagle: Records of the Museums and Art Galleries of the Northern Territory, Vol. 9, Dec 1992: 89-110 http://search.informit.com.au/documentSummary;dn=728469939268812;res=IELHSS [abstract]

Prehistoric marsupial genera
Prehistoric vombatiforms
Prehistoric vertebrates of Oceania